The name Erick, or Eric, has been used for nine tropical cyclones worldwide, seven in the Eastern Pacific Ocean and one each in the South-West Indian Ocean and in the South Pacific.

In the Eastern Pacific:
 Tropical Storm Erick (1983) 
 Tropical Storm Erick (1989) 
 Tropical Storm Erick (1995) 
 Tropical Storm Erick (2001) 
 Tropical Storm Erick (2007)
 Hurricane Erick (2013)
 Hurricane Erick (2019)

In the South-West Indian:
 Tropical Storm Eric (2008–09)

In the South Pacific:
Cyclone Eric (1985)

Pacific hurricane set index articles